Aishwarya Nag is an Indian actress and model, who has appeared in South Indian films, primarily in Kannada cinema. After her modelling, she made her acting debut in the film Neene Neene (2008). She rose to fame by acting in the Kannada film Jolly Days (2009) and Kal Manja (2010).

Career
Aishwarya debuted as a lead actress in the 2008 released film Neene Neene opposite Dhyan and Anant Nag when she was 16 years old. The film dealt with the pressures and hassles of tech workers, and was appreciated for being maturely dealt with. Aishwarya got a great deal of praise for holding her own against Anant Nag who played her dad in the film. She was next seen in the MD Shridhar film Jolly Days, a remake of the Telugu hit Happy Days. It was well received by critics, who called her a "very good heroine material in Kannada."

After a brief hiatus, she was seen in the comedy, Kal Manja, which also had Komal Kumar in the cast. The film met with favorable reviews and her performance was lauded by critics. She then signed the film Vighna opposite Vijay Raghavendra, which underwent several delays in the making process. 2013 year saw her majority releases with Prajwal Devaraj starrer Ziddi being the first release. She appeared in the comedy film Loosegalu, another comedy opposite Vijay Raghavendra named Chella Pilli, a romantic comedy Pataisu and Jaathre opposite Chetan Chandra. She is playing the lead protagonist role in T. S. Nagabharana's next directional Vasundhara. Nag is playing a lead role in the movie Muddu Manase where she is seen riding a Royal Enfield with ease. She has received good appreciation from the critics for the role. Aishwarya played a media reporter in the movie Jaathre in 2015. She is currently shooting for her next movie "The Gulaabi street" and is playing a lead role in the movie which is vaguely inspired by the Bollywood movie Fashion.

Filmography

References

External links

 

Living people
Year of birth missing (living people)
Actresses from Bangalore
Indian film actresses
Actresses in Kannada cinema
21st-century Indian actresses
Female models from Bangalore